Bedford College was founded in London in 1849 as the first higher education college for women in the United Kingdom. In 1900, it became a constituent of the University of London. Having played a leading role in the advancement of women in higher education and public life in general, it became fully coeducational (i.e. open to men) in the 1960s. In 1985, Bedford College merged with Royal Holloway College, another constituent of the University of London, to form Royal Holloway and Bedford New College. This remains the official name, but it is commonly called Royal Holloway, University of London (RHUL).

History

Foundation

The college was founded by Elizabeth Jesser Reid (née Sturch) in 1849, a social reformer and anti-slavery activist, who had been left a private income by her late husband, Dr John Reid, which she used to patronise various philanthropic causes. Mrs Reid and her circle of well-educated friends believed firmly in the need to improve education for women. She leased a house at 47 Bedford Square in the Bloomsbury area of London and opened the Ladies College in Bedford Square. The intention was to provide a liberal, non-sectarian education for women, something no other institution in the United Kingdom provided at the time. Reid placed £1,500 (GBP) with three male trustees and persuaded a number of her friends to serve on the management committees and act as teaching professors. In their first term they had 68 pupils.

Initially the governance of the College was in the hands of the Ladies Committee (comprising some influential women) and the General Committee made up of the Ladies, the professors of the college and three trustees. It was the first British institution partly directed by women. The General Committee (later the Council) soon took over the running of the College, while the Ladies Committee directed the work of the Lady Visitors, who were responsible for the welfare and discipline of the students, and acted as their chaperones. Initially the professors were shocked by the generally low educational standards of the women entering the college, who in most cases had only home-based governess education. In response, Reid founded Bedford College School close to the college in 1853, in an attempt to provide a better standard of entrants. In 1860, the college expanded into 48 Bedford Square, which enabled it to become a residential establishment. "The Residence" was in the charge of a matron, who introduced the practice of students help to run the house and keep their own accounts.

Succession
Elizabeth Reid died in 1866 and left a trust fund and the leases of the college's buildings in the hands of three female trustees Eliza Bostock, Jane Martineau and Eleanor Smith. The three of them were concerned that Bedford College School was to become Anglican under the head, Francis Martin. They closed the school although the idea went on without the trustees support as the Gower Street School being led, in time, by Lucy Harrison in 1875.

The trustees insisted on a new constitution (as the college had no legal charter at the time). The Council was replaced by a Committee of Management and the college reconstituted as an Association under the Board of Trade and officially became known as Bedford College.

In 1874, the Bedford Square lease expired and the college moved to 8 and 9 York Place, off Baker Street. Eliza Bostock was still a trustee but many looked to her as honorary Principal and with her knowledge of building and architecture she organised the college's move to York place. The two houses, 8 and 9, acted as one, with the college using the downstairs rooms and the upstairs being the Residence. As numbers began to rise, the college expanded by adding extensions to house science laboratories. In the late 1870s, an entrance examination was introduced and a preparatory department set up for those who did not meet the standards required for college-level entry.

Women with degrees
In 1878, degree examinations of the University of London were opened to women. Bedford College students began gaining University of London Bachelor of Arts, Bachelor of Science and Master's degrees from the early 1880s.

In 1900, when the University of London became a teaching university (where it had previously been only a degree-awarding body), Bedford College became one of its constituent colleges. It applied to the Privy Council for a Royal Charter to take the place of its Deed of Incorporation. Royal Assent for the new chartered body was received in 1909, and the College became officially recognised as Bedford College for Women.

Continued growth led to a search for new premises, leading to the purchase of the lease on a site at Regent's Park in 1908. A major fund-raising effort was undertaken to provide it with modern amenities. The purpose-built buildings were designed by the architect Basil Champneys and officially opened by Queen Mary in 1913. The buildings continued to be extended and rebuilt throughout the 70 years that the college spent at Regent's Park, especially after extensive damage from wartime bombing.

The college colours were green and grey, said to be those of Minerva. Purple was added in 1938 to represent the university; the resulting colours were, by chance or design, similar to those of women's suffrage in the United Kingdom.

A permanent record of the pictorial history of the college was made following the final reunion of former students and the collection and cataloguing of the archives in 1985.

Bedford firsts include:
First women to run a British institution.
First Social Sciences department in the UK, established 1918
First woman to hold a chair in philosophy in the UK, Susan Stebbing.
One of the first two women Fellows of the Royal Society
Fourth woman chairman of the Trades Union Congress (TUC), Marie Patterson
The first art school in England where women could draw from life

After a brief period of admitting a small number of male postgraduate students, the college became fully coeducational when 47 men passed through clearing in 1965, and the name reverted to Bedford College.

In the early 1980s, Bedford College had approximately 1,700 students and 200 academic staff based in 20 departments.

Merger with Royal Holloway
In 1985, Bedford College merged with Royal Holloway College, another college of the University of London which, like Bedford College, had been a college for women only when it was first founded. The merged institution took Royal Holloway College's premises in Egham, Surrey, just outside London, as its main campus and took on the name of Royal Holloway and Bedford New College (RHBNC). The decision to drop the Bedford name from day-to-day use caused some discontent among graduates of Bedford College, who felt that their old college had now essentially been taken over by Royal Holloway, and that Bedford College's name and history as a pioneering institution in the field of women's education were being forgotten. To give more prominence to the Bedford name, the merged college named a large, newly built library in the centre of its campus the "Bedford Library". Relations between RHUL and some of the Bedford College alumni remain somewhat strained, but many other Bedford College alumni maintain links with RHUL, supporting alumni events and other college work.

Bedford College's old premises in Regent's Park is now the home of Regent's University London.

Notable alumni

Rosetta Delisle, Social Worker
Louise Doris Adams (died 1965), president of the Mathematical Association
Mary Bridges-Adams (1854–1939), English educationalist
Shahidul Alam (born 1955), Bangladeshi photographer, writer and curator
Chris Aldridge, English BBC Radio 4 newsreader
Ajahn Amaro (born 1956), Theravadin Buddhist monk, and abbot of the Amaravati Buddhist Monastery
Catherine Ashton (born 1956), High Representative of the Union for Foreign Affairs and Security Policy (European Union)
Janet Backhouse (1938–2004), English expert on illuminated manuscripts
David Bellamy (1933–2019), English botanist and television presenter
Helen Caroline Bentwich (1892–1972), English social activist and politician
Elizabeth Blackwell (1821–1910), pioneer Anglo-American female physician
Daphne Blundell (1916–2004), British naval officer
Joane Bowes, MBE (1911–1981), Biochemist D.Sc. for work in leather and collagen
Mary Brazier (1904–1995), American neuroscientist
Sophie Bryant (1850–1922), Anglo-Irish mathematician and feminist
Anne Buck (1910–2005), British cultural historian and curator of dress
Ada Buisson (1839–1866), English author and novelist
Margaret Busby, Gold Coast-born publisher and writer
Waveney Bushell, Guyanese-born educational psychologist
Dinah Craik (1826–1887), English novelist and poet
Ilse Crawford, English interior designer 
Florence Nightingale David (1909–1993), English and American statistician
Evelyn Denington, Baroness Denington (1907–1998), English politician
Peggy Duff (1910–1981), British political activist, organiser of the Campaign for Nuclear Disarmament
Edith Durham (1863–1944), English traveller, artist and writer
George Eliot (1819–1880), English novelist
Christopher Elrington (1930–2009), English historian
Susan E. Evans, English palaeontologist and herpetologist
Penelope Farmer (born 1939), English children's novelist
Mary Fels (1863-1953), German-born American philanthropist, suffragist, Georgist
Dame Janet Finch (born 1946), English Vice-Chancellor and Professor of Social Relations at Keele University 1995–2010
Norvela Forster (1931–1993), English businesswoman and politician
Jane Gardam (born 1928), English novelist and children's writer
Miriam Violet Griffith (1911-1989) electrical engineer, technical author, expert in early heat pumps 
Jean Hanson (1919–1973), English biophysicist and zoologist
Jean Henderson (1899–1997), English barrister and Liberal Party politician
Jean Hillier, English town and country planning professor
Edith Humphrey (1875–1978), English inorganic chemist
Eva Ibbotson (née Wiesner, 1925–2010), Austro-English children's author
Alison Jaggar (born 1942), Anglo-American philosopher and feminist professor
Nick Kent (born 1951), English rock critic
Dudley Knowles (1947–2014), English political philosopher and professor
Jean Langhorne, British biologist
Judith Ledeboer (1901–1990), Dutch-English architect
Alice Lee (1858–1939), English mathematician
Kathleen Lonsdale (1903–1971), Anglo-Irish crystallographer
Adelaide Manning (1828–1905), writer and editor
Angela Mason (born 1944), English civil servant and gay activist
Gerda Mayer (born 1927), English poet born in Czechoslovakia
John Moloney, English comedian and writer
Delyth Morgan, Baroness Morgan of Drefelin (born 1961), English crossbench peer in the House of Lords
Jeremy Northam (born 1961), English actor
Nicholas O'Shaughnessy, English communications professor
Ursula Owen (born 1937), English publisher and campaigner for free expression
Margaret Partridge (1891–1967), electrical engineer, contractor, founder member of the Women's Engineering Society and the Electrical Association for Women
Delphine Parrott (1928–2016), English endocrinologist and immunologist
Marie Patterson (born 1934), English trade unionist
Edith Helen Paull (1902–1975), Indian nursing matron
Kate Perugini (1839–1929), English painter and daughter of Charles Dickens
Rosalind Pitt-Rivers FRS (1907–1990), English biochemist
Jenny Randerson, Baroness Randerson (born 1948), Welsh Liberal Democrat member of the House of Lords
Winifred Raphael (1898–1978), English occupational psychologist
Hazel Alden Reason (1901–1976), English chemist and science writer
Sarah Remond (1826–1894), African-American abolitionist, one of the few African-American women to speak publicly about abolishing slavery in America during the 1800s.
Jean Rook (1931–1991), English journalist
Andrew Cunningham Scott (born 1952), English geologist and professor
Joe Saward (born 1961), English motor-sports journalist
Athene Seyler (1889–1990), English actress and a President of RADA
Miranda Seymour (born 1948), English critic, novelist and biographer
Jacqueline Simpson (born 1930), English researcher and writer on folklore
Audrey Smith (1915–1981), English cryobiologist
Roger Steare (born 1958), English ethicist and corporate philosopher
Simon Thurley (born 1962), English architectural historian
Mavis Tiller (1901–1989), New Zealand women's advocate, scientist and president of the National Council of Women of New Zealand from 1966 to 1970
Mary Treadgold (1910–2005), English novelist and children's writer
Fred Trethewey (born 1949), Anglican priest and Archdeacon of Dudley
Margaret Tuke (1862–1847), English academic and educator
Sarah Tyacke (born 1945), English historian of cartography
Valerie Vaz (born 1954), current Labour MP for Walsall South (UK Parliament constituency)
Amanda Vickery (born 1962), English historian and broadcaster
Diana Warwick, Baroness Warwick of Undercliffe (born 1945), Labour member of the House of Lords
Evelyn Whitaker (1844–1929), English children's writer
Alex Wilkie (born 1948), English mathematician
Elizabeth Williams (1895–1986), English mathematician and educationist
Katharine Worth (1922–2015), English drama professor
Margaret Wright (1940–2012), British Green Party politician
Florence Yeldham (1877–1945), English school teacher and historian of arithmetic
Alice Zimmern (1855–1939), English translator and suffragist

Principals

 Elizabeth Jesser Reid, Founder (1849–1864) then run by trustees until first principal appointed
 Dame Emily Penrose, First principal (1893–1898) also Royal Holloway (1898–1907)
 Ethel Hurlbatt (1898–1906)
 Dame Margaret Jansen Tuke (1907–1929)
 Geraldine Emma May Jebb CBE (1930–1951)
 Norah Lillian Penston (1951–1964)
 Elizabeth Millicent Chilver (1964–1971), later Principal of Lady Margaret Hall, Oxford
 John Nicholson Black (1971–1981)
 Dorothy Wedderburn, last Principal of Bedford College (1981–1985)

References

Sources

External links
History of Royal Holloway and Bedford New College
Royal Holloway, University of London Archives
Genesis website page on Bedford College's archived papers
Genesis website page on Elizabeth Jesser Reid's archived papers
Notable Alumnae webpage of Royal Holloway and Bedford New College
Bedford College student lists
Bedford College in World Ward II, accessed 27 May 2012

 
Royal Holloway, University of London
Former colleges of the University of London
Former women's universities and colleges in the United Kingdom
Educational institutions established in 1849
Educational institutions disestablished in 1985
1849 establishments in England
Regent's Park